Voices of Fire is the sixth studio album by German a cappella metal band Van Canto. It also features John Rhys-Davies, the London Metro Voices and the children's choir from Chorakademie Dortmund. It is their last album with lead vocalist Sly, who would leave the band in 2017, as well as their only one without bass vocalist Ingo "Ike" Sterzinger, who left the band in the year before the album's release and re-joined it in the year after.

Reception 

The album received mixed to positive reviews by critics.

Track listing

Personnel 
Van Canto
 Dennis "Sly" Schunke – clean male vocals
 Inga Scharf – female vocals
 Ross Thompson – higher guitar vocals
 Stefan Schmidt – lower guitar vocals, solo guitar vocals, vocals with distortion effect
 Jan Moritz – bass vocals
 Bastian Emig – drums

Additional musicians
 Metro Voices - choir
 John Rhys-Davies - spoken words
 Chorakademie Dortmund - children's choir

Crew
 Osmar Arroyo - cover art

References 

2016 albums
Edel AG albums
Van Canto albums